The Japan Coast Guard Museum is a museum dedicated to the Japanese Coast Guard in Kure, Hiroshima Prefecture, Japan.  It is located on the grounds of the Japan Coast Guard Academy.

See also
Japan Coast Guard Museum Yokohama

External links
  

(Kure) 

Maritime museums in Japan
Museums in Hiroshima Prefecture
Japan Coast Guard
Coast guard history
Museums established in 1980
1980 establishments in Japan
Kure, Hiroshima